Events from the year 1510 in Ireland.

Incumbent
Lord: Henry VIII

Events
An Anglo-Irish army led by Gerald Mór FitzGerald, the 8th earl of Kildare, marches on Thomond, and is met and defeated at Cratloe by an army of the O'Brien, McNamara, Sil-Aedha and Clanrickard clans led by Turlough O'Brien.

References

 
Ireland
Years of the 16th century in Ireland